Jerrold Morton Post (February 8, 1934 – November 22, 2020) was an American psychiatrist and author. He was an analyst for the Central Intelligence Agency (C.I.A.) and the founder of the Center for the Analysis of Personality and Political Behavior. Post created a number of "psychobiographies" on notable individuals during his tenure at the C.I.A. and is credited in some sources as inventing the field of political psychology.

Biography

Early life and education 
Jerrold Morton Post was born on February 8, 1934, in New Haven, Connecticut. His mother was Lillian (Chaikind) Post, the bookkeeper at a shoe store, and his father was Jacob Post, a seller of movie reels to local theaters. Post worked his way through Yale University, from which he received his undergraduate degree in 1956. He received his M.D. degree in 1960, also from Yale. He completed a two-year residency at Harvard Medical School that was followed by a two-year fellowship at St. Elizabeth's psychiatric hospital in Washington, D.C.

Career 
In 1965, Post was preparing to accept a position at Harvard's McLean Hospital, when, through an acquaintance, he was recruited by the C.I.A., where he began developing psychological profiles of world leaders. After a career of 21 years at the C.I.A., in 1986, Post left to found a program of political psychology at George Washington University, where as a professor, he taught until 2015.

He was the founder and director of the Center for the Analysis of Personality and Political Behavior. He also maintained a private practice in psychiatry out of his home in Bethesda, Maryland.

Personal life and death
Post was married to Sharon (Ruttenberg) Post until her death in 1975. He married Carolyn Ashland in 1978. He and his first wife had two daughters, Cynthia Post, a psychologist, and Meredith Gramlich, a disability specialist. Post also had a stepdaughter, Kirsten Davidson. His sister was Judith Tischler. He played backgammon, jazz piano and tournament bridge.

Post had kidney failure in his later years and went to a dialysis center weekly. He suffered a stroke in July 2020, and could no longer drive to dialysis, so he took a medical taxi where it is believed he contracted COVID-19. On November 15, he tested positive for COVID-19. Post died from the virus one week later, on November 22, 2020.

Awards and honors 
In 1979, Post won the Intelligence Medal of Merit. In 1980, he won the Studies in Intelligence Award. In 2002, he received the Nevitt Sanford Award for Distinguished Professional Contributions to Political Psychology. He was a Life Fellow of the American Psychiatric Association.

Publications and articles 
Post authored 14 books and scores of articles. His last book was entitled, "Dangerous Charisma: The Political Psychology of Donald Trump and His Followers", which he co-authored with Stephanie R. Doucette. It was published one year prior to the 2020 election.

References

External links 
 Former CIA profiler Jerrold Post on Donald Trump's "dangerous charisma"
 Jerrold Post: The man who analysed the minds of world leaders
 

American psychiatrists
Recipients of the Intelligence Medal of Merit
Yale School of Medicine alumni
1934 births
2020 deaths
Deaths from the COVID-19 pandemic in Maryland
American political psychologists